Elikalpeni Bank is a submerged bank or sunken atoll belonging to the Amindivi Subgroup of islands of the Union Territory of Lakshadweep, India.

Geography

Elikalpeni Bank is the easternmost geographic feature of the Lakshadweep Archipelago, although other little researched banks with depths of as little as 18.3 m lie about 32 km east of Elikalpeni.

Image gallery

References

External links

Elikalpeni Bank, India
List of Atolls
Sources towards a history of the Laccadive Islands

Undersea banks of Lakshadweep
Reefs of India